Nikola Dragović (born December 20, 1987) is a Serbian professional basketball player. He played college basketball at UCLA.

Early career
Dragović grew up with KK Avala Ada (nowadays Mega Basket) juniors and made his debut with the senior team during the 2005–06 season. 

From 2006 to 2010, Dragović played college basketball at UCLA.

Professional career
In 2010, he signed for Spartak St. Petersburg and he stayed there till the end of 2011–12 season when his contract has expired and the team decided not to prolong it. The forward struggled with injuries throughout the 2011–12 season missing bigger part of the games.

In August 2012, he signed with Italian team Sidigas Avellino. In August 2013, he re-signed with them for one more season.

In September 2014, he signed a one-year deal with Igokea. On February 4, 2015, he left Igokea. Later that month, he signed with Lukoil Academic of the Bulgarian League for the rest of the season.

In November 2015, he signed with the German club Mitteldeutscher BC of the Basketball Bundesliga for the rest of the season. On January 3, 2016, he left Mitteldeutscher BC and signed with Vanoli Cremona of the Italian Serie A for the rest of the season.

On July 5, 2016, he signed with French club ASVEL Basket.

On August 1, 2017, he signed with Spanish club Basket Zaragoza for the 2017–18 season.

In January 2019, Dragović joined Mexican team Mineros de Zacatecas.

On March 19, 2021, Dragović moved to Greece for Kolossos Rodou. In three games, he averaged 7.7 points and 3.7 rebounds per game. On October 12, Dragović signed with Nazm Avaran Sirjan of the Iranian Basketball Super League.

National team career
Dragović has been member of the Serbia U-16, U-18 and U-20 national teams, won the gold medal at the 2003 European U-16 Championship in Spain, won the gold medal at the 2005 European -18 Championship at Serbia, won the gold medal at the 2006 European U-20 Championship in Nova Gorica. Dragović was also a member of the team that represented Serbia at the 2011 Summer Universiade in Shenzhen, finishing as the gold medal winners.

See also 
 List of Serbian NBA Summer League players

References

External links
Euroleague profile
Eurobasket.com profile
FIBA.com profile
Legabasket profile

1987 births
Living people
ABA League players
KK Avala Ada players
ASVEL Basket players
Bàsquet Manresa players
Basket Zaragoza players
BC Spartak Saint Petersburg players
KK Igokea players
KK Mega Basket players
Kolossos Rodou B.C. players
OKK Beograd players
Liga ACB players
Medalists at the 2011 Summer Universiade
Mitteldeutscher BC players
PBC Academic players
Power forwards (basketball)
Serbian men's basketball players
Serbian expatriate basketball people in Belarus
Serbian expatriate basketball people in Bulgaria
Serbian expatriate basketball people in France
Serbian expatriate basketball people in Italy
Serbian expatriate basketball people in Iran
Serbian expatriate basketball people in Mexico
Serbian expatriate basketball people in Russia
Serbian expatriate basketball people in Saudi Arabia
Serbian expatriate basketball people in Spain
Serbian expatriate basketball people in the United States
Serbs of Montenegro
S.S. Felice Scandone players
Sportspeople from Podgorica
UCLA Bruins men's basketball players
Universiade gold medalists for Serbia
Universiade medalists in basketball
Vanoli Cremona players
Mineros de Zacatecas (basketball) players